Simple Sis is a 1927 American silent comedy-melodrama directed by Herman C. Raymaker and starring Louise Fazenda as a poor, plain laundress hoping for romance, supported by Clyde Cook as a shy suitor and Myrna Loy as a cruel beauty.

No copies of Simple Sis are known to exist; it is presumed lost.

Plot
Sis, a laundress, is neither beautiful nor clever, but she still wishes to attract a boyfriend. When attractive Edith Van inadvertently hides her love-letter in the wrong pocket, Sis finds it and, thinking it is for her, goes to meet the lover. The mistake is soon exposed and Edith ridicules Sis. Sis meets truck driver Jerry when he rescues her from a purse-snatcher. Because of his extreme shyness, she thinks he has no interest in her. After taking in the orphaned Buddy, Sis loses her job. Although she saves Buddy from a fire, welfare workers remove him from her care. In the end, Sis, Jerry, and Buddy are united as a family.

Cast
 Louise Fazenda as Sis  
 Clyde Cook as Jerry O'Grady  
 Myrna Loy as Edith Van  
 William Demarest as Oscar  
 Billy Kent Schaefer as Buddy 
 Cathleen Calhoun as Mrs. Brown, Buddy's Mother

Release
Simple Sis was released June 11, 1927, the second of four Warner Bros. feature films released that month.

Variety summed up the production as "colorless" and "of negligible entertainment or box office value". The reviewer for Motion Picture News called it "hokum" and thought it came across as depressing rather than comedic. In the brief Photoplay review, audiences were warned of boredom and Fazenda was deemed "worthy of better stories".

Box office
According to Warner Bros records, the film earned $136,000 domestically and $49,000 foreign.

References
Notes

Citations

External links
 
 Still from Simple Sis, at Getty Images

1927 films
1927 comedy films
1927 lost films
1920s English-language films
American silent feature films
Silent American comedy films
Warner Bros. films
American black-and-white films
Lost American films
Lost comedy films
Films directed by Herman C. Raymaker
1920s American films